Molecular computational identification (MCID) is a technique in which molecules are used as means for identifying individual cells or nanodevices.

See also
 RFID

References

Automatic identification and data capture
Ubiquitous computing